Airstream is an American brand of travel trailer ("caravan" in British English) easily recognized by the distinctive shape of its rounded and polished aluminum coachwork. This body shape dates back to the 1930s and is based on the Bowlus Road Chief, an earlier all-aluminum travel trailer designed and built by Hawley Bowlus, the same designer and engineer who also oversaw the construction of the Spirit of St. Louis.

Airstream trailers and recreational vehicles are manufactured in Jackson Center, Ohio, United States. The company, now a division of Thor Industries, employs more than 800 people, and is the oldest in the industry.

History

The company was created by Wally Byam who began building trailers out of Masonite in his backyard in Los Angeles during the late 1920s. Byam published a magazine selling "how-to" kits to customers wishing to build their own trailers. In 1936, Byam introduced the "Airstream Clipper", which was essentially a rebadged 1935 Bowlus Road Chief, with the door relocated from the front to the side. The design cut down on wind resistance and thus improved fuel efficiency. It was the first of the now familiar sausage-shaped, silver aluminum Airstream trailers. In 1936, the first Airstream was introduced. Named the Clipper, after the first trans-Atlantic flying boat. Sold for $1,200 it was able to house four people, had electric lights and a water supply. Of more than 400 travel trailer builders operating in 1936, Airstream was the sole survivor of the Depression.

During World War II, travel became a luxury most could not afford and non-military industries faced an acute aluminum shortage. When World War II ended, the economy boomed, and people's attention once again turned towards leisure travel. Byam's company went back into production in 1948. In July 1952, a new facility in Jackson Center, Ohio, was established. 1979 saw the last Airstreams to be manufactured in California.

In 1974, Airstream began manufacturing a Class A motorhome, badged "Argosy". They began as painted  models, and were followed in 1979 by the first examples of the Classic model motorhome, with an unpainted aluminum body much like the trailers.

The aluminum motorhomes were followed by more traditional-looking fiberglass models in the 1990s. Airstream discontinued manufacture of Class A motorhomes in 2006. One bus model, the Skydeck, featured interior stairs leading to a deck on the roof.

In 1981, Airstream's Commercial Vehicle Division marketed a Class A motorhome as a funeral coach. It was designed to transport family, flowers and the deceased from the funeral home to the cemetery.

Starting in 1989, Airstream built Class B motorhomes based on the Ford Econoline chassis and the Dodge B-series van chassis. Production ceased after the 1999 model year. In 2004, Airstream introduced the Westfalia and Interstate, built on the Mercedes-Benz Sprinter chassis. The Westfalia was discontinued in 2006.

In February 2022, the company unveiled a concept all-electric Airstream with the ability to recharge in multiple ways from electric outlets at campgrounds to regenerative braking. The vehicle also has the option for five 180-watt semi-flexible solar panels for a total of 900 watts of power. The concept also has the ability for remotely or autonomously backing up the vehicle. The e-RV would offer 5G connectivity, Wi-Fi hotspot, voice commands, and touch screens for manipulating all onboard activities.

In the United Kingdom and Europe 

Airstream are distributed in the United Kingdom and Ireland by Lowdhams Airstream Direct (Lowdham Leisure World Ltd) with four models made for Europe and specifically tuned for the British market. The International "534", "604", "684" and the new "25" have been created with smaller dimensions to accommodate narrower European roads. The International are still entirely manufactured at the headquarters in Ohio and shipped over for final fit of market specific items. Airstream are also popular amongst the European market for takeaway diners and business stands.

Airstream Europe are distributed by Airstream Germany and Airstream Italy.

Production

As of January 2015, Airstream was producing 50 trailers per week or about 2,600 per year. The company was expanding its capacity with plans to increase production by at least 50% over 2014 levels. By April 2016, the Dayton Business Journal reported that Airstream was producing 72 trailers per week--an annual rate of 3,744 assuming consistent production all year. The same article said they were aiming to increase to 77 trailers per week in 2016.

Nest acquisition

In 2016, Airstream acquired Nest Caravans, which was an Oregon-based company which had one product in development, at the prototype stage. Nest trailers are made of molded fiberglass. The Nest is a smaller and lower priced trailer than any in the Airstream line, but at the upper end of prices for its market segment, that was to be sold for $29,995 before the acquisition. Airstream CEO, Bob Wheeler said "Nest is a product that conveys sophistication, simplicity, and upscale modernity, so it made sense for us to partner and help bring this design to market." Airstream moved the company to Ohio and expanded staff for production which is underway. Airstream Nest trailers were scheduled to be available in early 2018. The Airstream Nest was withdrawn from the market in September 2020.

Airstream parks

There are more than a dozen Airstream parks throughout the United States. These are RV resorts or campgrounds where owners of Airstream-manufactured units are allowed to buy, rent or lease a site. Some of these facilities welcome non-Airstream products, while others are more strict in their admission. Some of the parks require membership in the WBCCI (Wally Byam Caravan Club International) to be admitted. Several of the resorts are owned and operated by the local unit of the WBCCI.

Airstreamers

Airstreamers are a group of "RV-ers" who share a community spirit because of their common love of the trailers. In the early 1950s, Airstream company founder Wally Byam began leading groups of owners on travels to many portions of the world, where the towed trailers were quite remarkable. Photos taken of the trailers in front of many famous tourist sites were common. This promoted a mystique which surrounded Airstreams and persists to this day.

The Wally Byam Caravan Club was formed in Kentville, Nova Scotia, Canada during the 1955 Eastern Canada Caravan. Later, the word "International" was added to the club name, resulting in the acronym "WBCCI". On August 17, 2005, a commemorative plaque was dedicated on the site. The club continues to offer RV caravans all over the USA, Canada, and Mexico (contracted) each year. Club members join together for one large international rally each summer, and hundreds of smaller local rallies are held coast-to-coast by "units" (chapters). The club even has a very active "unit" in Europe. Airstreams are still popular, and restoration of older models is a passion shared by many.

Space program 

Upon their return from the Moon, the crewmen of the missions Apollo 11, 12 and 14 were quarantined, until it was deemed that there was little likelihood of them having brought back lunar pathogens. From the crew's collection aboard an aircraft carrier, until their arrival in the Lunar Receiving Laboratory in Houston, they were housed in the mobile quarantine facility, which was a modified airtight Airstream trailer. Four were built in total, and the three that were actually used can be seen on display at various space museums.

For decades, NASA has used a fleet of Airstream motorhomes to transport astronauts to the launch pad. The space shuttle program used a modified 1983 Airstream Excella beginning in 1984 dubbed the Astrovan.

On October 21, 2019, Airstream and Boeing announced that a modified Airstream Atlas (which also uses a Mercedes-Benz Sprinter chassis), will be used to transport Boeing commercial crew astronauts to the launch pad where they would board the CST-100 Starliner on their way to the International Space Station.

United States Air Force
The United States Air Force uses a modified version of the Airstream Silver Bullet aboard C-17 aircraft when officials from the Air Force, Department of Defense, or the United States Government are traveling overseas. However, it will soon be replaced by custom Roll-On Conference Capsules that are airworthy for the entirety of the flight, unlike the modified Airstreams. The trailers are strapped down inside military cargo planes. The trailers feature leather seats, air conditioning and climate control, wood paneling, porcelain toilet, LED televisions, surround sound, and Blu-ray players.

References

External links

 Airstream Company Website
 Airstream Camping (Vince Patton, Oregon Field Guide)
 Airstream Life Magazine, an independent magazine covering the Airstream lifestyle

Caravan and travel trailer manufacturers
Companies based in Ohio
Shelby County, Ohio
Streamliners